The 2014–15 season was the 118th season of competitive football by Heart of Midlothian and the first under new ownership following the club's exit from administration on 11 June 2014. Following 31 consecutive seasons in the top level of Scottish football, this was the club's first season of play in the second tier of Scottish football since the 1982–83 season, having been relegated from the Scottish Premiership to the Scottish Championship at the end of the previous season. Hearts also competed in the Challenge Cup, League Cup and the Scottish Cup.

Friendlies
Hearts returned for pre-season training on 26 June,  before heading to England for a four-day training camp in Chester, with games against Ludogorets Razgrad and Dinamo București. On return to Scotland the club travelled to Hamilton Academical and East Fife, before hosting Manchester City in a glamour friendly at Tynecastle to celebrate the centenary of the main stand. The remainder of the pre-season fixtures were spent on the road, with games against Dundee, a Testimonial for Steven Anderson at St Johnstone and lastly against Cowdenbeath.

Fixtures

Scottish Championship

Fixtures

Challenge Cup

Hearts entered the Challenge cup for the first time in their history and were placed in the south section of the draw. The draw took place on 2 July 2014 and the club were drawn against Scottish League Two side Annan Athletic.

Fixtures

League Cup

Having played in the Scottish Premiership during the previous season and not qualified for the Europa League, Hearts entered the League Cup at the second round stage. The draw was held on 6 August 2014 and the club were drawn away from home against Scottish League One side Stenhousemuir.

Fixtures

Scottish Cup

Fixtures

First team player statistics

Captains

Squad information
During the 2014–15 season, Hearts have used thirty-five different players in competitive games. The table below includes all players who have been part of the first team during the season. They may not have made an appearance.
Last updated 2 May 2015
{| class="wikitable" style="font-size: 100%; text-align: center;"
|-
! style="background:maroon; color:white;" scope="col" rowspan="2" width="10%" align="center"|Number
! style="background:maroon; color:white;" scope="col" rowspan="2" width="10%" align="center"|Position
! style="background:maroon; color:white;" scope="col" rowspan="2" width="10%" align="center"|Nation
! style="background:maroon; color:white;" scope="col" rowspan="2" width="20%" align="center"|Name
! style="background:maroon; color:white;" scope="col" colspan="2" align="center"|Totals
! style="background:maroon; color:white;" scope="col" colspan="2" align="center"|Championship
! style="background:maroon; color:white;" scope="col" colspan="2" align="center"|Challenge Cup
! style="background:maroon; color:white;" scope="col" colspan="2" align="center"|League Cup
! style="background:maroon; color:white;" scope="col" colspan="2" align="center"|Scottish Cup
|-
! style="background:maroon; color:white;" scope="col" width=60 align="center"|Apps
! style="background:maroon; color:white;" scope="col" width=60 align="center"|Goals
! style="background:maroon; color:white;" scope="col" width=60 align="center"|Apps
! style="background:maroon; color:white;" scope="col" width=60 align="center"|Goals
! style="background:maroon; color:white;" scope="col" width=60 align="center"|Apps
! style="background:maroon; color:white;" scope="col" width=60 align="center"|Goals
! style="background:maroon; color:white;" scope="col" width=60 align="center"|Apps
! style="background:maroon; color:white;" scope="col" width=60 align="center"|Goals
! style="background:maroon; color:white;" scope="col" width=60 align="center"|Apps
! style="background:maroon; color:white;" scope="col" width=60 align="center"|Goals
|-
|-
   
  

   
  
    
  
   
     
      
   
  
      
           
   
         
  
  
    
 
    
   
    
    
 
    
 
              
       
   
   
    
   
    
                      
    
     

Appearances (starts and substitute appearances) and goals include those in Scottish Premiership, Challenge Cup, League Cup and the Scottish Cup.

Disciplinary record
During the 2014–15 season, Hearts players have been issued with sixty-six yellow cards and five reds. The table below shows the number of cards and type shown to each player.
Last updated 2 May 2015

Top scorers 
Last updated on 2 May 2015

Own goals  
Last updated on 2 May 2015

Clean sheets
{| class="wikitable" style="font-size: 95%; text-align: center;"
|-
! style="background:maroon; color:white;" scope="col" width=60|  
! style="background:maroon; color:white;" scope="col" width=60|
! style="background:maroon; color:white;" scope="col" width=60|
! style="background:maroon; color:white;" scope="col" width=150|Name
! style="background:maroon; color:white;" scope="col" width=80|Championship
! style="background:maroon; color:white;" scope="col" width=80|Challenge Cup
! style="background:maroon; color:white;" scope="col" width=80|League Cup
! style="background:maroon; color:white;" scope="col" width=80|Scottish Cup
! style="background:maroon; color:white;" scope="col" width=80|Total
|-
|1
|GK
|
|Neil Alexander
|13
|0
|0
|0
|13
|-
|2
|GK
|
|Jack Hamilton
|2
|0
|0
|0
|2
|-
|3
|GK
|
|Scott Gallacher
|0
|0
|0
|0
|0
|-
|
|
|
! Totals !! 15 !! 0 !! 0 !! 0 !! 15

Team statistics

League table

Division summary

Management statistics
Last updated on 2 May 2015

Club

Club staff

Boardroom 

|-

Playing kit
Hearts kits were manufactured by Adidas for the 2014–15 season, having signed a long term deal two seasons previously. The new home kit for the season is a modern twist on the kit used during the 1914–15 season and pays tribute to the squad and the anniversary of McCrae's Battalion. The club lost seven players during World War I, John Allan, James Boyd, Duncan Currie, Ernest Ellis, Tom Gracie, James Speedie and Harry Wattie. As a mark of respect the kit features no sponsor and a unique badge. Speaking about the kit the club said that “The strip for season 2014/15 is dedicated to the club’s greatest ever team which went to war in 1914,” “Their efforts have been recorded in story and in song and we felt strongly that the centenary of this side should now be marked in an appropriate fashion by the current first-team players. “Having consulted the supporters about a commemorative crest, we believe the unique badge for the new season is another fitting tribute to the team of 1914–15 and we would like to take this opportunity to thank the SPFL and the Scottish FA for granting their approval of this change. The club's new home kit went on sale to people who had preordered on 15 May, priced at £45.00 for an adults top with kids priced at £35.00. The kit went on general public sale on 9 June, having been delayed from 15 May due to over 4,000 pre orders being taken for the new kit.

The away kit for the 2014–15 season is sponsored as a gift from the club by The Foundation of Hearts, ending the clubs association with previous commercial shirt sponsor Wonga.com. The kit went on sale to the public on 4 July, at the same pricing. A limited edition clean version of the away kit, without the sponsor logo, was released on 5 August.

Awards
The following Hearts players were also included in the Scottish Championship PFA Scotland Team of the Year, Neil Alexander, Alim Öztürk, Danny Wilson, Morgaro Gomis, Jamie Walker and Osman Sow.

League awards

Club awards

Transfers

Players in

Players out

Loans and temporary transfers In

Loans and temporary transfers out

Contract extensions
The following players extended their contracts with the club over the course of the season.

See also
List of Heart of Midlothian F.C. seasons

Notes

References 

2014andndash;15
Heart of Midlothian